Ye Sacred Muses is William Byrd's Musical elegy on the death of his colleague and mentor, Thomas Tallis, in the form of a secular madrigal. It is scored for 5 voices (usually four viols and countertenor), though the vocal part is scored for treble voice, or a cappella SATTB choir.

The words are:-

Ye sacred Muses, race of Jove,
whom Music's lore delighteth,
Come down from crystal heav'ns above
to earth where sorrow dwelleth,
In mourning weeds, with tears in eyes:
Tallis is dead, and Music dies.

The concluding lines are particularly effective and are repeated. The tonality of the piece is slightly ambiguous, as despite its ending on a D major chord, it never really settles in any one key. Byrd uses the Dorian mode whilst his Renaissance contemporaries generally avoided the use of Medieval modes either by sharpening leading tones or lowering the fourth in the Lydian mode. Byrd’s use of the Dorian mode can be seen in the very first phrase of the piece.

External links

Informal performance by 'Wolftooth' (viol consort and alto)

Funerary and memorial compositions
Compositions by William Byrd
Thomas Tallis
Composer tributes (classical music)